Sabina Fluxà Thienemann (born April 1980) is a Spanish businessperson, and the vice-chairman and CEO of Iberostar Hotels & Resorts.

Early life and education
Sabina Fluxà was born in April 1980, the eldest daughter of Miguel Fluxà Rosselló, the billionaire chairman and 100% owner of Iberostar Hotels & Resorts, and his wife, Sabina Thienemann. Her younger sister, Gloria Fluxà, is the vice-chairman of Iberostar

Fluxà earned a bachelor's degree and MBA from ESADE Business School.

Career
In January 2005, she joined Iberostar, a company founded by her father.

In 2017, Fluxà was included in a list of the top 100 women leaders in Spain.

As of 2017, Fluxà is a member of the regional advisory board of BBVA, a member of the governing Board of APD Illes Balears and patron of the Fundacion Iberostar, the Endeavor Foundation, and the ACS Foundation.

Personal life
In 2012, she married Alfonso Fierro in Mallorca. The wedding banquet took place at Son Antich farm in Esporles, and the wedding was a huge social event.

References

1980 births
Living people
21st-century Spanish businesspeople
ESADE alumni
Sabina
Directors of Telefónica